Tephrodytes is an extinct genus of prehistoric frog known from Arikareean of Montana.

See also

 Prehistoric amphibian
 List of prehistoric amphibians

References

Pelodytidae
Cenozoic amphibians
Fossil taxa described in 1994